HMS Zenith has been the name of more than one ship of the British Royal Navy, and may refer to:

 Zenith, a drifter considered for service but acquisition cancelled in 1919
 , originally named HMS Zenith but renamed in January 1943 prior to completion, a destroyer in commission from 1944 to 1946
 , originally named HMS Wessex but renamed in January 1943 prior to completion, a destroyer in commission from 1944 to 1947

The name "HMS Zenith" also was given to a shore establishment, the Royal Naval Volunteer Reserve Division at Southampton, England, in 1946.

Royal Navy ship names